The women's 500 m time trial competition at the 2002 Asian Games was held on 4 October at the Geumjeong Velodrome.

Schedule
All times are Korea Standard Time (UTC+09:00)

Records

Results 
Legend
DNS — Did not start

References

External links 
Results

Track Women Time Trial